Igor Ivashintsov (born 30 January 1972) is a Belarusian sailor. He competed in the men's 470 event at the 2000 Summer Olympics.

References

External links
 

1972 births
Living people
Belarusian male sailors (sport)
Olympic sailors of Belarus
Sailors at the 2000 Summer Olympics – 470
Sportspeople from Minsk
20th-century Belarusian people